Syrine Ebondo (née Balti; born 31 October 1983) is a Tunisian track and field athlete who competes in the pole vault. She is one of Africa's top pole vaulters and is a seven-time African champion. Her personal best of 4.21 metres, set in 2006, was the Tunisian record for the event until it was surpassed by Dorra_Mahfoudhi in Rabat 2019 (4.31 metres).

Athletic career
Born in Tunis, she won her first international medal at the age of fifteen, taking the pole vault title at the 1999 African Junior Athletics Championships. She became the first women's pole vault champion at the 1999 Pan Arab Games, following its introduction into the programme. Balti cleared four metres for the first time in 2000 and went on to claim the gold medal at the 2000 African Championships in Athletics. From 2001 onwards she based her training in Toulouse in France. That year she achieved an African junior indoor record of 4.10 metres.

She was ninth at the 2001 Francophone Games and sixth at the 2001 Mediterranean Games. In 2002, she came ninth at the 2002 World Junior Championships in Athletics then defended her title at the African Championships. A personal best of 4.10 metres at the 2002 IAAF World Cup was also an African junior record mark. She vaulted 4.20 metres indoors in 2003 (a Tunisian record) and matched that height outdoors in 2004. A third straight African championship title came that year, and she also defended her crown at the 2004 Pan Arab Games.

Her 2005 season was highlighted by a win at the Arab Athletics Championships and a silver medal at the 2005 Francophone Games. She equalled her indoor record of 4.20 m at the French Championships and set an outright best of 4.21 m for a fourth consecutive win at the 2006 African Championships, which was also a championship record). She was again chosen as Africa's representative at the 2006 IAAF World Cup and she finished in seventh.

Her 2007 season was curtailed and she dropped out of the sport altogether, not returning until the 2012 season. She came back to win her fifth gold medal at the 2012 African Championships in Athletics. She won her sixth gold medal at the 2014 African Championships in Athletics, tying Moroccan discus thrower Zoubida Laayouni for the most individual wins by a woman at the African Championships.

Competition record

References

External links

Living people
1983 births
Sportspeople from Tunis
Tunisian female pole vaulters
Athletes (track and field) at the 2015 African Games
African Games gold medalists for Tunisia
African Games medalists in athletics (track and field)
Athletes (track and field) at the 2001 Mediterranean Games
Mediterranean Games competitors for Tunisia
Islamic Solidarity Games medalists in athletics
20th-century Tunisian women
21st-century Tunisian women